David Meca Medina (born 1 February 1974 in Sabadell) is a long distance swimmer from Spain, who has swum from mainland Spain to Ibiza among his exploits. He won gold at the 2005 FINA World Championships in Montreal for the men's open water 25 km.

Meca took silver in the 5 km event at the 2000 World Championships in Hawaii. He also won silver in the 25 km competition and a bronze in the 10 km at the 2003 World Aquatics Championships in Barcelona, Spain.

Meca served a one-year ban on every competition and a four-year ban on championships following a positive test for nandrolone, a banned performance enhancer, in 1999. He was able to participate in World Championships in year 2000 because the sanction had not then been confirmed by the FINA. The sanction that was finally lifted because the swimmer was considered clean, after a long battle to prove his innocence. 

It was during the time of this sanction that he started focusing on challenges which nobody had done before. He swam from mainland Spain to Ibiza (about 80 miles or 129 km), in more than 27 hours swimming non-stop; and swam from Alcatraz to mainland San Francisco in less than 3 hours.

Meca successfully swam the English Channel on 10 August 2004 in 7 h 46 mins, and again on 29 August 2005 in 7 h 22 mins.

He swims for the Club Natació Sabadell.

See also
List of sportspeople sanctioned for doping offences

References

External links

Official website

1974 births
Living people
Swimmers from Catalonia
Doping cases in swimming
Male long-distance swimmers
English Channel swimmers
Spanish sportspeople in doping cases
World Aquatics Championships medalists in open water swimming
Sportspeople from Sabadell